I.D. and Urgent Calls is a Big Finish Productions audio drama based on the long-running British science fiction television series Doctor Who. It is the first play to be released as a three-part story with a separate one-part story included.

ID

Plot
The Doctor arrives in the future at a huge dumping site for old computers. Scavenger ships scour the discarded materials for valuable data: one of the ships is from the borderline illegal Lonway Clinic, which specialises in personality surgery. The Doctor investigates the death of one of the clinic's researchers, and realises that what the clinic is searching for here should perhaps remain lost.

Cast
The Doctor — Colin Baker
Claudia Bridge — Sara Griffiths
Doctor Marriott — Gyles Brandreth
Ms Tevez — Helen Atkinson Wood
Scandroids — David Dobson
Lake — Kerry Skinner
Gabe Stillinger — Joe Thompson
Denise Stillinger — Natasha Pyne

Urgent Calls

Plot
A wrong telephone number on 1974 Earth has strange consequences.

Cast
The Doctor — Colin Baker
Lauren – Kate Brown
D.J. – David Dobson
Connie – Kerry Skinner

Continuity
Urgent Calls begins the "Virus Strand" story arc, which spans the three subsequent one-episode stories Urban Myths, The Vanity Box and Mission of the Viyrans.

Notes
Sara Griffiths played Ray in the Seventh Doctor TV story Delta and the Bannermen.
There is an interview with Gyles Brandreth at the end of CD 1, where he discusses his meeting each of the Doctors and other topics.
Excluding multi-Doctor stories, this is the first Doctor Who main range audio released by Big Finish that does not feature a companion or returning enemy.

External links
Big Finish Productions – I.D. 

2007 audio plays
Sixth Doctor audio plays